Brij Bhoomi is a 1982 Indian film based on Braj culture. It was the first film in the Braj Bhasha language. It was directed and produced by Shiv Kumar, who also starred in the film, and the lyrics and music were by Ravindra Jain.

Cast
Raja Bundela
Alka Nupur
Shiv Kumar
Bharati Achrekar 
Sandeepan Nagar
Krishna Sharma
Tom Alter (Guest Appearance)
Aruna Irani (Guest Appearance)

Soundtrack
Charon Dhamon Se nirala Brij Dham  - Ravindra Jain & Chorus
Gopal tere Aaye bina - Anuradha
Ram Dhaniya o Raja Ram Dhaniya - Hemlata
Jhoola to Pad gaye - Chandrani Mukherjee & Sushil Kumar
Shyam Lalla Dal leke Chala - Ravindra Jain
Goro Rang bhayo jeeko Janjal - Hemlata
Bida Gopal Bida - Chandrani Mukherjee, Sushil Kumar & Chorus

References

External links
 

1982 films
Braj Bhasha language films
Films shot in Uttar Pradesh